The Disney Skyliner is a gondola lift system, part of the Disney Transport system at Walt Disney World in Bay Lake, Florida. Each gondola cabin can hold up to ten guests, or up to six with an open wheelchair or electric scooter. Guests sit on twin, inward-facing, wooden benches. Strollers  and smaller are able to roll directly into the gondola and do not have to be folded.

Predecessors

Not long after the opening of Disneyland in 1955, a similar gondola system called the Skyway debuted, connecting Fantasyland and Tomorrowland. When Magic Kingdom at the Walt Disney World Resort was opened, the same gondola system was implemented – as well as at Tokyo Disneyland when it opened to the public in 1983. The Magic Kingdom Skyway closed in 1999, with the station in Tomorrowland demolished in 2009 and the Fantasyland station demolished in 2012.

History

Construction
On February 15, 2017, the Reedy Creek Improvement District filed plans with the South Florida Water Management District for "various improvements." Among these plans was a design for a  building in the shape of a "V," consistent with a gondola lift changing direction. The blueprints described improvements to the south end of Epcot at the World Showcase, as well as in Disney's BoardWalk Resort and Disney's Hollywood Studios. These V-shaped structures were also planned for Disney's Caribbean Beach Resort, Disney's Pop Century Resort and Disney's Art of Animation Resort.

On July 15, 2017, the gondola lift plan was confirmed at the D23 Expo. Bob Chapek, then chairman of Disney Parks, Experiences and Products, said that the system was going to connect four hotels with Epcot and Disney's Hollywood Studios, affording "a bird's-eye view" of the area. No opening date was announced at the time. The proposal was announced as part of the unveiling of 23 improvements to Disney Parks, including a "makeover" of Epcot and carpool-style "Minnie vans." The Disney Skyliner would also connect to Disney's Riviera Resort.

By 2018, the Disney Skyliner was already under construction. The towers and gondola stations were more than halfway completed by summer 2018. In November 2018, Disney Parks announced that the Disney Skyliner would open in fall 2019. Testing with passenger cabins began in late January 2019, on the Hollywood Studios line.

Operation
In July 2019, the Disney Skyliner was given a September 29, 2019 opening date and began operations as scheduled.

Select Skyliner cabins feature characters from Disney Animation, Pixar, Star Wars and Guardians of the Galaxy as well as Walt Disney World attractions The Haunted Mansion and Pirates of the Caribbean. With over 250 cabins in operation, each one features onboard audio, which is unique to each of the three routes. Each cabin has wooden bench-style seating that fits a maximum of 10 people, 5 per bench. Operating hours vary depending on park hours and if weather permits, such as wind and lightning, in which case, operation would be suspended and alternate transportation is offered via Disney Transport buses. Depending on the route, park hours and season, the Disney Skyliner begins operations up to an hour and a half prior to park operating hours; all routes remain open an hour and a half after each park closing.

Routes

The lines for the Disney Skyliner are hubbed from a central terminus at Caribbean Beach Resort.

Riviera Resort and Epcot line
The longest of the three lines is the Epcot line. Departing from the Caribbean Beach hub, the line rises up to cross over the Jamaica and Aruba Villages of the resort, before descending to the first of two midstations at the Riviera Resort. This is also accessible from and adjacent to the Aruba village of Caribbean Beach. Here, the line turns west and travels alongside Buena Vista Drive. As it reaches the Boardwalk Tennis Courts parking lot, the line hits its second midstation. This midstation is unthemed, as it only serves to turn the line to resume traveling north. After crossing over the Epcot Resorts Boulevard and passing behind the France pavilion at World Showcase, the gondola descends into its final terminus at the International Gateway entrance to World Showcase. The zig-zag route of the Epcot line enables the line to avoid bisecting World Showcase and backstage areas. The journey time for a one-way journey along the full route from Caribbean Beach to Epcot is 11 minutes. A journey between Caribbean Beach and Riviera takes three minutes, and the journey between Riviera and Epcot takes six minutes.

Hollywood Studios line
The Hollywood Studios line heads due west out of the Caribbean Beach hub. The first part of the line cuts through previously unused forest space, before descending and crossing over the tollbooth entrance to the Hollywood Studios parking lot. The line then crosses through the parking lot before descending into its Hollywood Studios terminus, in between the park entrance and the bus stop. The ride time for a one-way journey on the Hollywood Studios route is 5 minutes.

Pop Century Resort/Art of Animation Resort line
The shortest of the three routes. This line heads due south from the Caribbean Beach hub towards the Pop Century Resort and Art of Animation Resort. The first half of the line takes place over reclaimed swampland. After passing by the Art of Animation Resort's north building, the line descends and travels across Hourglass Lake, ending at a terminus on the middle of the lake. A one-way journey on the Pop Century Resort/Art of Animation Resort line takes 4 minutes.

Operational system

The Skyliner is the only gondola system in North America with double loading, and the second double loading aerial lift system in the country after Quicksilver Super6 at Breckenridge Ski Resort in Colorado. At the end terminals of each line, most cabins unload their guests at the first unload area immediately after decelerating, then turn around before loading guests on the other side of the terminal. However, some cabins are routed through automatic switches to a secondary loading and unloading zone which is designed for disabled passengers and those with mobility issues who need additional time to board the cabin. These cabins are stopped for a fixed period of time at a platform to load and unload guests, before rejoining the main conveyor of gondola cabins at the merge point.

Incidents

The Disney Skyliner experiences delays and stops of its lines that are usually resettable either immediately or within 5–20 minutes, depending on the case (i.e. safety, assistance, maintenance, security). In more severe situations, where the system is no longer suitable for normal operation and guest transport, and has delayed further than 20 minutes, evacuations can be conducted by Reedy Creek Fire Department if the system is shut down and cannot be immediately reset.

On October 5, 2019, a gondola became jammed while exiting the Riviera Resort station for the Epcot station. A subsequent backlog of gondolas got stuck behind the jammed gondola inside the station; there were no known injuries, but the Epcot line was closed for the remainder of the night.

Gallery

Notes

See also
Disney Transport

References

External links

 

Gondola lifts in the United States
Walt Disney World transit
2019 establishments in Florida
Transport infrastructure completed in 2019